The 1932 Notre Dame Fighting Irish football team was an American football team that represented the University of Notre Dame as an independent during the 1932 college football season. In its second season under head coach Hunk Anderson, the team compiled a 7–2 record and outscored opponents by a total of 255 to 31. Paul Host was the team captain. The team played its home games at Notre Dame Stadium in South Bend, Indiana.

Schedule

References

Notre Dame
Notre Dame Fighting Irish football seasons
Notre Dame Fighting Irish football